Portrait of a Man is a c. 1657 portrait painting painted by Rembrandt. It is an oil on canvas and is in the collection of the Metropolitan Museum of Art.

Description
This painting came into the collection via the Henry G. Marquand bequest.

This painting was documented by Hofstede de Groot in 1914, who wrote:753. A PALE MAN WITH LONG DARK HAIR. Bode 222; Dut. 339; Wb. 209; B.-HdG. 495. About forty. Half-length with one hand; life size. He stands, seen almost in full face, looking straight before him. His left hand is in his black cloak, which envelopes the figure. He wears a large, smooth, close-fitting collar with tassels and a high broad-brimmed black hat. He has a slight moustache, is partly shaven, and has dark eyes. The light falls from the left on the right side of the face and the collar. The background is illumined to the left. Signed in full, and dated 1664; canvas, 31 1/2 inches by 25 inches. Mentioned by Bode, pp. 531, 588; Dutuit, p. 46; Michel, p. 442]. 
Exhibited at the Hudson-Fulton Celebration, Metropolitan Museum, New York, 1909, No. 107. In the collection of the Marquess of Lansdowne, London, 1883. In the collection of H. G. Marquand, New York; given by him in 1890 to the Museum.

Despite extensive research, the sitter and earlier owners of this painting are unknown. Surface examination has shown that the date Hofstede de Groot saw had disappeared by the 1950s, and the overall condition of the painting is rather abraded. The shading of the eyes under the hat is characteristic of Rembrandt's work in the 1650s.

References

Cat. no. 155 in Dutch Paintings in the Metropolitan Museum of Art Volume I, by Walter Liedtke, Metropolitan Museum of Art, 2007

External links
Portrait of a man, tweede helft van de jaren 1650 in the RKD

1650s paintings
Paintings in the collection of the Metropolitan Museum of Art
Man
Rembrandt